Booth may refer to:

People
 Booth (surname)
 Booth (given name)

Fictional characters
 August Wayne Booth, from the television series Once Upon A Time
Cliff Booth, a supporting character of the 2019 film Once Upon a Time in Hollywood, played by Brad Pitt
 Frank Booth (Blue Velvet), main villain of the 1986 film Blue Velvet, played by Dennis Hopper
Missy Booth, a main character on the television series Ackley Bridge, played by Poppy Lee Friar
Seeley Booth, a main character on the television series Bones, played by David Boreanaz

Places

Antarctica
 Mount Booth
 Booth Spur
 Booth Island

Canada
 Booth Island (Nunavut)

England
 Booth, East Riding of Yorkshire, a small village
 Booth Park, a cricket ground in Toft, Cheshire

United States
 Booth, Alabama, an unincorporated community
 Booth, Missouri, a ghost town
 Booth, Texas, an unincorporated community
 Booth Farm, Pennsylvania, on the National Register of Historic Places
 Booth Homestead, Ohio, on the National Register of Historic Places
 Booth State Scenic Corridor, a state park in Oregon

Outer space
 13825 Booth, an asteroid

Schools
 Booth School of Business, University of Chicago
 Booth University College, Winnipeg, Canada

Buildings
 Booth House (disambiguation), several buildings
 Booth Mansion, Chester, Cheshire, England
 Booth Theatre, Manhattan, New York City, named for actor Edwin Booth
 Booth Theater (Independence, Kansas)
 Booth Library, Eastern Illinois University
 Booth Memorial Hospital, several hospitals

In business
 Booths, UK supermarket chain
 Booth Newspapers, a newspaper publishing company
 Booth's Gin

Other uses
Booth (novel), 2022 novel by Karen Joy Fowler
 Booth baronets, three baronetcies
 Booth Museum of Natural History, Brighton and Hove, England
 Booth Western Art Museum, Cartersville, Georgia, United States
  (DE-170), a United States Navy destroyer escort which served in World War II
 Booth, a play by Austin Pendleton
 A synonym for market stall
 The Booth, a 2005 Japanese horror film

See also 
 Boothe, a list of people with the surname
 Boothe Lake, Yosemite National Park, California, United States
 Boothe Memorial Park and Museum, Stratford, Connecticut, United States
 Isolation booth, a device used to prevent a person or people from seeing or hearing certain events
 Photo booth, a vending machine or kiosk which contains an automated camera and film processor
 Voting booth, in which voters cast their ballots in secrecy
 Telephone booth, a small structure furnished with a payphone
 Box office or ticket booth, a place where admission tickets are sold
Tollbooth, a place on a toll road where an authority collects a fee for use
 Food booth, a structure from which food is sold
 Control booth, the area of the theater designated for the operation of technical equipment
 Armored booth, generally found outside of embassies and military installations
 Booth's multiplication algorithm, an algorithm invented by Andrew D. Booth